Fischenthal railway station is a railway station in the Swiss canton of Zurich, and the municipality of Fischenthal. It is located on the Tösstalbahn between Winterthur and Rapperswil, and is served by Zurich S-Bahn line S26.

References 

Railway stations in the canton of Zürich
Swiss Federal Railways stations